Notable theatres named Torch Theatre include:

Torch Theatre, Dublin, Ireland
Torch Theatre, Milford Haven, Wales